Anthonomus robustulus is a species of true weevil in the beetle family Curculionidae. It is found in North America. This species is described by its 6-jointed funicle, and light bluish-gray scales.

References

Further reading

 
 

Curculioninae
Articles created by Qbugbot
Beetles described in 1876